Dr. Soumana Sacko (born 23 December 1950) is a Malian politician and economist. Sacko served as Prime Minister from 9 April 1991 to 9 June 1992 during the first and transitional presidency of Amadou Toumani Touré.

Education
Sacko obtained a Diplôme d'Etudes en Langue Française (DELF) from the Mopti Examination Center in June 1967 and a baccalaureate in June 1970 from the Lycée Askia Mohamed in Bamako. He also holds a bachelor's degree in Project Management Planning from National School of Administration (ENA) and a Master and Ph.D. in Economics Development (Honours) from the University of Pittsburgh. He also attended training courses and seminars at the West German Foundation for International Development (DSE), Institute for Economic Development of the World Bank and the General Accounting Office of the United States Congress.

Other positions
Sacko has held other positions both within and outside of the Mali government. He was previously the Minister of Finance and Commerce in 1987. He became the first Malian to resign from the government in 1987 following a gold trading case involving the First Lady of Mali. Outside of the government, Sacko has acted as a senior economist at the United Nations Development Program (UNDP) and Executive Secretary of the African Capacity Building Foundation (ACBF).

Sources

External links
 "Civilian Named in Mali as Interim Premier" 3 April 1991. New York Times

1950 births
Living people
Malian economists
Prime Ministers of Mali
United Nations Development Programme officials
Finance ministers of Mali
Government ministers of Mali
People from Koulikoro Region
Malian officials of the United Nations
21st-century Malian people